These are the results for the 2005 edition of the Tirreno–Adriatico race, a sprinter showdown won by then World Champion Óscar Freire.

Stages

09-03-2005: Civitavecchia, 160 km

10-03-2005: Civitavecchia-Tivoli, 181 km

11-03-2005: Tivoli-Torricella, 228 km

12-03-2005: Teramo-Servigliano, 160 km

13-03-2005: Saltara, 170.4 km

14-03-2005: Civitanova Marche, 164 km

15-03-2005: San Benedetto del Tronto, 164 km

General standings

 Danilo Hondo was later disqualified for failing a doping test.

KOM classification

Points classification

Best team

External links
Race website

2005
2005 UCI ProTour
2006 in Italian sport